Max Eugene Biggs (June 15, 1923 – October 25, 1990) was an American professional basketball player. Biggs played in four games in the National Basketball League for the Sheboygan Red Skins during the 1946–47 season A native of Lafayette, Indiana, Biggs played basketball for one season at Purdue University before enrolling in the navy. He also played for Purdue's football team.

References

1923 births
1990 deaths
American men's basketball players
Basketball players from Indiana
Centers (basketball)
Forwards (basketball)
Purdue Boilermakers football players
Purdue Boilermakers men's basketball players
Sheboygan Red Skins players
People from Warren County, Indiana
United States Navy personnel of World War II